Prairiewood High School is a government-funded co-educational dual modality partially academically selective and comprehensive secondary day school located in , a south-western suburb of Sydney, New South Wales, Australia. 

Established in 1984, the school caters for approximately 1,200 students from Year 7 to Year 12, including 74 percent of whom come from a language background other than English. The school is operated by the New South Wales Department of Education.

See also 

 List of government schools in New South Wales
 List of selective high schools in New South Wales

References 

Public high schools in Sydney
Educational institutions established in 1984
1984 establishments in Australia
Selective schools in New South Wales
South Western Sydney